Rich Valley is a hamlet in central Alberta, Canada within Lac Ste. Anne County.

History 
Rich Valley was originally called "Onion Prairie". The first post office was established in the home of the Carlin family in 1909.

Demographics 
The population of Rich Valley according to the 2008 municipal census conducted by Lac Ste. Anne County is 32.

Infrastructure 
Rich Valley Public Library 

Rich Valley School - Northern Gateway Public Schools (K-7)

Rich Valley Community Church

Notable people 
Georges Charles-Jules Bugnet, Canadian writer and horticulturalist, did much of his plant hybridization work at Rich Valley.

William Purdy, Former MLA of Stoney Plain (1971-1986) and first mayor of the Village of Wabuman.

See also 
List of communities in Alberta
List of hamlets in Alberta

References 

Hamlets in Alberta
Lac Ste. Anne County